Rumohra adiantiformis, the leather fern or leatherleaf fern, is a species of fern in the wood fern family Dryopteridaceae. It has a wide distribution, mainly in the tropical Southern Hemisphere.

Names
Other common names include leathery shieldfern, iron fern, 7-weeks-fern, and climbing shield fern.

Description
These contain round sori (reproductive clusters) on the underside of the pinnae (leaflets) unlike many other ferns which have separate specialized reproductive fronds. Many of the sori have protective peltate indusia (films), and prominent scales on the stipes of the fronds.

Distribution
Rumohra adiantiformis is native to South America, the Caribbean, southern Africa, the Western Indian Ocean islands, Papua New Guinea, and Australasia. Countries it is native to include such diverse places as Brazil and Colombia, the Galápagos Islands, the Greater Antilles in the Caribbean, Zimbabwe and South Africa Australia, and New Zealand.

Ecology
An example of plant associations of Rumohra adiantiformis is found in the podocarp/broadleaf forests of Westland, New Zealand, with flora associates including Ascarina lucida, Pseudowintera colorata, Pseudopanax colensoi, Cyathea smithii and Blechnum discolor.

Cultivation
The fern is cultivated as an ornamental plant for groundcover and in floristry. As it is a tropical plant with only limited protection against frost, in temperate climates it is normally grown under glass as a houseplant.
In the UK it has gained the Royal Horticultural Society’s Award of Garden Merit. 

It is of economic importance in Brazil, where thousands of people generate their income by wild-harvesting and selling the fronds for use in flower arrangements.

References

External links

Friday Fellow: Leatherleaf Fern at Earthling Nature.

Dryopteridaceae
Ferns of Africa
Ferns of the Americas
Ferns of Asia
Ferns of Oceania
Flora of northern South America
Flora of southern South America
Flora of western South America
Ferns of Argentina
Ferns of Brazil
Ferns of Chile
Flora of the Galápagos Islands
Flora of the Caribbean
Flora of the Western Indian Ocean
Flora of South Africa
Flora of Zimbabwe
Ferns of New Zealand
Ferns of Australia
Flora of Tasmania
Flora of Papua New Guinea
Garden plants